James Cantrell (7 May 1882 – 31 July 1960) was an English professional footballer who played as a forward for Aston Villa, Notts County, Tottenham Hotspur and Sutton Town.

Football career 
Cantrell began his professional career at Aston Villa. The inside forward played in 48 matches and found the net on 22 occasions for the club between 1904–1907. He moved to Notts County in 1907 where he was converted into the centre forward position. Top scorer in his three seasons at County he maintained a goal every other match ratio in 131 matches and scoring 64 goals in his time there. Tottenham Hotspur impressed by his goal scoring paid a substantial sum for his services in 1912. In a career interrupted by the First World War Cantrell lead the Spurs forward line that won the Football League Second Division in 1919-20 with a then record 70 points. He went on to collect a winner's medal in the 1921 FA Cup Final at the age of 38. He played his last match against Birmingham City just short of his 40th birthday making him the oldest Spurs player to feature in a League match. This record lasted until 6 May 2012 when Brad Friedel appeared for Tottenham Hotspur against Aston Villa in the Premier League. Cantrell remains the oldest outfield player to appear for Spurs. Cantrell played 176 times and scored on 84 occasions in all competitions between 1912–1922. He joined Midland League club Sutton Town on 8 October 1923, retiring in 1925.

Honours
Tottenham Hotspur
 Football League Second Division: 1919–20
 FA Cup: 1920–21

After football 
Cantrell returned to Nottingham where he became a golf professional. He died in Basford in 1960.

References

External links 
 Jimmy Cantrell biography Retrieved 9 February 2009

1882 births
1960 deaths
People from the Borough of Chesterfield
Footballers from Derbyshire
English footballers
English Football League players
Association football forwards
Aston Villa F.C. players
Notts County F.C. players
Tottenham Hotspur F.C. players
Sutton United F.C. players
FA Cup Final players